Charlene Mae Gonzales Bonnin-Muhlach (born May 1, 1974) is a Filipina actress, media personality, and beauty queen. Gonzales won the Binibining Pilipinas Universe 1994 title and represented her country at the Miss Universe 1994 pageant held in Manila, where she won the Best National Costume award and was one of the Top 6 Finalists.

She is also an award-winning talk show host and a commercial model.

Early and personal life
Gonzales was born to actor Bernard Bonnin and model Elvira Gonzales, on May 1, 1974. Among her siblings is actor Richard Bonnin, and her cousin is Bagets actor J.C. Bonnin. She is of Spanish ancestry. She attended Bishop Amat Memorial Highschool in La Puente, California, finishing in 1992. She earned a degree in BS Psychology from the University of Santo Tomas.

She married Filipino actor Aga Muhlach on May 28, 2001. They have twin children born on November 5, 2001, named Andrés and Atasha.

Pageant career
Gonzales won the Binibining Pilipinas Universe 1994 title and represented her country at the Miss Universe 1994 pageant held in Manila, where she won the Best National Costume award and landed in the Top 6. When asked by the host about the number of islands in the Philippines, she boldly asked back, “High tide or low tide?”

Career
She hosted the dance program Eezy Dancing on ABC-5 (1997–1998) and Keep On Dancing from (1998–2001) on ABS-CBN and Viva Television Movies on Viva TV. She hosted the show, At Home Ka Dito, a Philippine lifestyle program airing on ABS-CBN. Adding to its branding as a show is the introduction of a reality TV treatment to its features, pioneering what may be a new trend—the reality TV lifestyle show.

In 1994, Gonzales got her first film role with Fernando Poe Jr. in Epimaco Velasco: NBI. She also starred in Ben Delubyo with Ramon "Bong" Revilla Jr. in (1998) and Resbak with Phillip Salvador (1998).

Television

Film

Awards and nominations

Bb. Pilipinas and Ms. Universe awards

TV awards and nominations

References

External links
Official Binibining Pilipinas website - Past Titleholders

1974 births
Living people
ABS-CBN personalities
Actresses from Metro Manila
Binibining Pilipinas winners
Filipino female models
Filipino film actresses
Filipino people of Spanish descent
Filipino television talk show hosts
GMA Network personalities
Miss Universe 1994 contestants
Charlene
People from Muntinlupa
Viva Artists Agency